Lower Darwen railway station was a railway station that served the village of Lower Darwen, in Lancashire, England.

History
The station was closed on 3 November 1958 by British Railways, and subsequently was demolished.

Lower Darwen motive power depot, which closed in the 1960s, was located to the north of the station, near the Ewood area of Blackburn.

Location
The station was located to the north of the B6231 Fore Street, which the railway crosses on Rakes Bridge.

Site today
The line on which the station was situated remains open with services between Clitheroe/Blackburn and Manchester Victoria being operated by Northern.

References

Welch, S. Lancashire Steam Finale, 

Disused railway stations in Blackburn with Darwen
Buildings and structures in Blackburn
Former Lancashire and Yorkshire Railway stations
Railway stations in Great Britain opened in 1847
Railway stations in Great Britain closed in 1958
1847 establishments in England